Romanthi Maria Colombage (born May 19, 1984) is a model and beauty queen who was crowned Miss Sri Lanka and represented Sri Lanka in Miss World 2007 in China.  Colombage is one of the most successful models in Sri Lanka. She has done fashion shows in Europe and Asia.

Background 
Colombage was born in Colombo, Sri Lanka. She has one sister, Rapthi in her family. She was educated at Holy Family Convent Colombo 04 and completed a Diploma in Fashion Designing by the age of 18, followed by the Chartered Institute of Marketing qualification which she acquired by the age of 21. She has her Masters in Business Administration from the University of Wales in Cardiff.

She was approached by a choreographer when she was just seventeen and was asked to model for a fashion show in Colombo and was trained to be a catwalk model. Thereafter she has modeled on ramp around Europe and Asia.

In 2003, she was one of the creative Minds behind one of Sri Lankas most prominent Brands Named "Bellucci" owned by Businessman Roshan Perera  which designed and manufactured figurines for Disney and Hallmark. She was also instrumental in diversifying the Brand into Clothing

Modelling and Fashion 
She has done several photoshoots both in Sri Lanka and India. When she was just 18 she flew to Dubai and Pakistan to model and then was taken to Germany, London and Paris to model on ramp. She has also modeled in Thailand, Singapore and China. She soon made a name for herself in her home country and was crowned Miss Sri Lanka for Miss World in 2007.

She was approached in 2008 by Prasad Bidappa Associates in Bangalore to model, and was selected to become the new face of ābharan jewelry Bangalore India in 2008. She spent six months in India modeling thereafter.

Colombage has also been the face for Colombo Jewellery Stores Sri Lanka and did their campaigns in 2008 and 2009. She modeled for  Buddhi batiks swim wear photoshoot in 2010. Colombage has secured contracts with Nations Trust Bank, Singer and Asian Alliance Insurance appearing in advertisements.

Personal life 
On July 10, 2010 she married Gayan Wijesinha an investment banker working in London. She was married in S. Thomas' Chapel, Mount Lavinia. The wedding reception was held at the Mount Lavinia Hotel private beach. She and her husband now live in London.

References

External links

Miss World 2007 delegates
Living people
1984 births
Sri Lankan beauty pageant winners
Sri Lankan emigrants to the United Kingdom